Enda Rohan (born 16 October 1929), is an Irish chess player, Irish Chess Union secretary (1952–1957).

Biography
Enda Rohan was born in Clontarf, Dublin. In 1952 he graduated from University College Dublin in which he studied physics. From 1952 to 1995 Enda Rohan worked as an engineer in various telecommunications companies both in Ireland and in other countries: in Malaysia (1965), Liberia (1966–1967) and Albania (1994–1995). In 1947 he was one of the founders of a Clontarf Chess Club. From 1952 to 1957 Enda Rohan was appointed secretary of the Irish Chess Union. He has done much to develop the international contacts of Irish chess life.

Enda Rohan played for Ireland in the Chess Olympiad:
 In 1954, at second reserve board in the 11th Chess Olympiad in Amsterdam (+0, =0, -2).

References
Enda Rohan passed away recently in county Galway. R.I.P

External links

Enda Rohan chess games at 365chess.com

1929 births
Living people
Sportspeople from Dublin (city)
Irish chess players
Chess Olympiad competitors
20th-century chess players
Alumni of University College Dublin